Adelaide Park is a rural locality in the Livingstone Shire, Queensland, Australia.

Geography 
Adelaide Park is in the hinterland of the Capricorn Coast. It is bounded to the west by Limestone Creek and to the north by a line of hills approx 200 metres above sea level. Another line of hills runs from the north-west to the south-east of the locality from about 130 metres to 340 metres at Mount Barmoya.

History 
The locality takes its name from the Adelaide Park pastoral station that roughly occupied the land of the present day Adelaide Park locality. The land was purchased in 1868 by James and Mary Atherton who moved there in 1870. The Atherton family established the first road to Rockhampton and then extended it to Yeppoon.

Education 
There are no schools in Adelaide Park. The nearest primary school is Yeppoon State School in Yeppoon to the south-east and Farnborough State School in neighbouring Farnborough to the north-east. The nearest secondary school is Yeppoon State High School in Yeppoon.

References 

Shire of Livingstone
Localities in Queensland